Gisborne or Gisbourne is a surname originating in the East Midlands/North of England, possibly connected to the town of Gisburn (formerly Gisburne) in Lancashire (formerly West Riding of Yorkshire). Notable people with the surname include:

Frederic Newton Gisborne (1824–1892), Canadian inventor and electrician
Henry Fyshe Gisborne (1815–1841), English-born Australian bureaucrat and socialite, son of Thomas Gisborne the Younger
Thomas Gisbourne the Elder (1758–1846), English Anglican divine, priest and poet
Thomas Gisborne the Younger (1790–1852), English Whig MP
William Gisborne (1825–1898), New Zealand Colonial Secretary

Fictional characters:
Guy of Gisbourne, villain in the Robin Hood legends

English toponymic surnames